Vartak Nagar is a locality in Thane city of Maharashtra state in India. It's nearly 4.3 kilometers from Thane railway station. Pokhran Road No. 1 cuts through this locality to join Pokhran Road No. 2 at Upvan Lake. A major part of Vartak Nagar is covered by the 63-acre MHADA colony buildings. These buildings are largely occupied by industrial workers employed in manufacturing units in and around Thane.

Most of the residents used to work in manufacturing units/factories around Vartak Nagar and other localities. Some of the renowned companies like Raymonds, Kores, Voltas, NRB Bearing, Blue Star and many others had their units in Vartak Nagar and adjoining areas. Adjoining areas would include Shastri Nagar, Samata Nagar and Yashodhan Nagar/Lokmanya Nagar.

One of the famous landmarks in the area is the Sai Baba Mandir. Schools in this area include Sulochana Devi Singhania High School, Little Flower High School, Brahman Vidyalaya, Smt Savitri Devi Thirani School and College.

The area is gradually undergoing transformation due to redevelopment and new real estate development as well.

Buildings here include Dosti Vihar, Kores Towers, Vedant Complex, etc.

References

Neighbourhoods in Thane
Geography of Thane